Kennet Lara (born 10 June 1999) is a Chilean football player who plays as defender for Curicó Unido in Chilean Primera División.

References

1999 births
Living people
Chilean footballers
Chile under-20 international footballers
Chilean Primera División players
Curicó Unido footballers
Association football defenders